Cedar Island is an island on Fourth Lake in Hamilton County, New York.

References

Islands of New York (state)